Boronia splendida is a species of plant in the citrus family, Rutaceae, and is endemic to Queensland, Australia. It is an erect shrub with most parts covered with star-like hairs and has simple, linear to narrow elliptic leaves, and pink to white, four-petalled flowers.

Description
The eight stamens have a large appendage on the end. Flowering occurs from March to November.

Taxonomy and naming
Boronia splendida was first formally described in 1999 by Marco F. Duretto and the description was published in the journal Austrobaileya. The specific epithet (splendida) is a Latin word meaning "bright" or "shining", referring to the relatively large flowers of this species.

Distribution and habitat
This boronia grows in woodland between Chinchilla and Dalby.

Conservation status
Boronia splendida is a rare and poorly collected species but is classed as "least concern" under the Queensland Government Nature Conservation Act 1992.

References 

splendida
Flora of Queensland
Plants described in 1999
Taxa named by Marco Duretto